Michal Adrian Zajkowski (born 11 July 1983) is an ice hockey Goaltender who is currently a free agent. He last played for Örnsköldsviks HF in the Hockeyettan. He was born in Łódź, Poland, and moved to Sweden when he was six years old.

References

External links

1983 births
IF Björklöven players
Brûleurs de Loups players
Lillehammer IK players
Braehead Clan players
Modo Hockey players
Örebro HK players
IK Oskarshamn players
Polish emigrants to Sweden
Sportspeople from Łódź
IF Sundsvall Hockey players
Swedish ice hockey goaltenders
Swedish people of Polish descent
Tingsryds AIF players
Living people
Swedish expatriate ice hockey players in Norway
Polish expatriate sportspeople in Scotland
Polish expatriate sportspeople in Norway
Swedish expatriate sportspeople in France
Expatriate ice hockey players in Scotland
Polish expatriate sportspeople in France
Expatriate ice hockey players in France